Morrison Institute for Public Policy  is an Arizona State University resource for objective policy analysis and expertise. Morrison Institute researches public policy issues, informs policy makers and residents, and advises leaders on choices and actions.

As part of the School of Public Affairs (College of Public Service & Community Solutions), the Institute bridges the gap between academic scholarship and public policy development through its services to public and private sector clients and its independent research agenda. The Institute provides services in the areas of public policy research, program evaluation, and public outreach to many types of public and private organizations in Arizona and throughout the United States.

Morrison Institute was established in 1982 through a grant from Marvin and June Morrison of Gilbert, Arizona in response to the state's growing need for objective research on issues of public policy. Since then, Morrison Institute has conducted work on a wide range of topics, including education reform, water resources, health care, human services, urban growth, government structure, arts and culture, technology, quality of life, public finance, the environment, and economic development.

In October 2012, Morrison Institute launched the Morrison Institute Latino Public Policy Center  to clarify how and why Latino-related issues affect Arizona's future due to the state's changing demographics and dynamics.

Morrison Institute also manages Arizona Indicators , an online data collection and analysis website for Arizona and the region.

See also 

 Public policy
 Arizona State University
 Decision Theater

External links 

 Morrison Institute for Public Policy
 College of Public Service & Community Solutions
 School of Public Affairs
 Arizona State University

Arizona State University
Educational institutions established in 1982
1982 establishments in Arizona